Rancho is a former fishing village and neighbourhood of Oranjestad, Aruba. In the late 20th century, it was annexed by Oranjestad.

History
Rancho was first mentioned in 1855 as a fishing village with small huts located in the vicinity of the Oranjestad The village had a little harbour where ships used to anchor for Oranjestad. In 1928, Arend Petroleum Maatschappij, a subsidiary of Royal Dutch Shell, opened an oil refinery near Rancho which resulted in a population increase and the construction of stone houses.

Rancho and Oranjestad merged into a single urban area, and in the late 20th century it was annexed. In order to preserve the village characteristics, buildings are limited to a height of five metres unless an exception is granted. Rancho has become an impoverished part of the city. On 20 April 2010, the Rancho Foundation was established to preserve the former fishing village.

Overview

Rancho is home the only remaining lime kiln of Aruba. It was built in 1892 and had been in operation until 1949. It was restored in 1970, and has been declared a monument.

In 1905, Hendrik Eman was given permission to lay pipes from the water wells in Saliña and Madiki to the harbour of Oranjestad. Excess water was stored in a water tank in Rancho, and sold to the inhabitants of the city. In 2020, a program began to conserve the water tank as an early industrial heritage site.

The National Archaeological Museum Aruba is located in Rancho, and the tram has a stop in Rancho.

Notable people
 Boy Ecury (1922–1944), World War II resistance fighter
 Nydia Ecury (1926–2012), writer and actress

References

Oranjestad, Aruba
Populated places in Aruba